Xianyang is a prefecture-level city in central Shaanxi province, situated on the Wei River a few kilometers upstream (west) from the provincial capital of Xi'an. Once the capital of the Qin dynasty, it is now integrated into the Xi'an metropolitan area, one of the main urban agglomerations in northwestern China, with more than 7.17 million inhabitants, its built-up area made of 2 urban districts (Qindu and Weicheng) was 945,420 inhabitants at the 2010 census.

Xianyang is the seat of the Xi'an Xianyang International Airport, the main airport serving Xi'an and the largest airport in Northwest China, and one of the top 40th-busiest airports in the world.

Xianyang is one of the top 500 cities in the world by scientific research outputs, as tracked by the Nature Index. It is home to the main campus of Northwest A&F University (NWAFU), one of the world's top universities in agriculture science related fields, and a member of "Project 985" club which is an organization of 39 reputable universities in China.

History

Xianyang was among the capital city's environs during the Western Zhou dynasty, and was made the capital of the state of Qin in 350 BC during the Warring States period before becoming the capital of China during the short-lived Qin dynasty. Because the city lay south of the Jiuzong Mountains and north of the Wei River – both sunlight-rich (yang) orientations – it was named "Xianyang", meaning "fully yang".

Under Duke Xiao of Qin's reign, minister Shang Yang designed Xianyang and in 350 BC organized the relocation of Qin's administration from the old capital Yueyang to the new city, which was then the capital for over 140 years. It was located in the modern day Shaanxi province on the northern bank of the Wei River, on the opposite side of which Liu Bang would later build the Han dynasty capital of Chang'an once he became emperor.

In 221 BC, Qin Shi Huang eliminated all six other warring states to establish the first centralized empire in Chinese history. Xianyang became the center of politics, economy and culture of the Qin empire. Noble families were compelled to move into Xianyang, and the realm's weapons were gathered in the city to be melted and cast into twelve towering statues. The Emperor had a lavish mausoleum built near the capital, complete with his Terracotta Army. This and other large undertakings diverted enormous levels of manpower and resources away from agriculture. Coupled with the state's repressive measures on the population, these factors eventually led to the fall of the Qin dynasty and with it the original city of Xianyang.

Qin Shi Huang expanded Xianyang beyond the walls. Then he built replicas of the palaces of all the conquered states along the Wei River. In 220 BC, he built Xin Palace and later renamed it Wei Palace, named after the Wei River. He continued with the theme of earth as the mirror of heaven building a network of 300 palaces in the Wei valley connected by elevated roads. In 212 BC, he built the Epang Palace.

Shortly after the First Emperor's death in 210 BC revolts erupted. At the beginning of December 207 BC, the last Qin emperor Ziying surrendered to rebel leader Liu Bang, who entered Xianyang peacefully without harming the locals. However, Liu Bang was forced to hand the city over to another more ruthless rebel leader, Xiang Yu, whose army greatly outnumbered Liu Bang's. Xiang Yu then killed Ziying and burned Xianyang in 206 BC, destroying the sole surviving copies of several banned books that were kept in the royal library.

In 202 BC, after defeating Xiang Yu in Battle of Gaixia and ending the Chu-Han contention, Liu Bang was crowned the emperor of the newly established Han dynasty, and he built a new capital across the Wei River merely miles from the ruins of old Xianyang and named this new city Chang'an. The Han-era town of Anling (tomb of emperor Hui) was located nearby and houses some of the Han dynasty's mausoleums.

Archeology 
From the end of the 1950s until the middle of the 1990s, archeologists discovered and excavated numerous Qin era sites in Xianyang, including palaces, workshops and tombs.

Administrative divisions

Chinese Bureau of Statistics lists the urban population of the city at 316,641 (1990 Census), rising to 814,625 (2000 Census), and 835,648 in 2010 Census.

Climate

Education 
Xianyang is home to the main campus of Northwest A&F University (NWAFU), one of the world's top universities in agriculture science related-fields, and a member of "Project 985" club which is an organization of 39 reputable universities in China.

National

 Northwest A&F University (NWAFU)
 Shaanxi University of Science & Technology

Public

 Shaanxi University of Chinese Medicine
 Xianyang Normal University

Transport 
China National Highway 312
Xi'an Xianyang International Airport
Xianyang West railway station
Xi'an Metro Line 1

References

Further reading

External links 

Official website of Xianyang Government

 
Cities in Shaanxi
Ancient Chinese capitals
Qin dynasty